Thommy Berggren, né Tommy William Berggren (born 12 August 1937) is a Swedish actor. He was a frequent collaborator of director Bo Widerberg, and was active from the early 1960s to the mid-2000s when he retired. 

Berggren starred in the film Raven's End (1963), directed by Widerberg, as well as the 1992 film Sunday's Children, which was directed by Daniel Bergman.

Early life
Berggren was born on 12 August 1937, in Mölndal, Sweden, an impoverished working class district. His father, a sailor by trade and a socialist, was involved with the worker's rights movement in Sweden. His mother was employed at the local factory and was similarly politically inclined. When he was born, he suffered with a disease of the lungs, which caused him to have to stay in a hospital facility for one year. Berggren also had to deal with the fact that his father was severely alcoholic. In Stefan Jarl's 2002 film The Bricklayer, a documentary about Berggren's life and career, he recounted an incident in which he had walked a great distance to meet his father at a train station, only to discover that he had not kept the appointment with his son. Instead, he had remained in town drinking.

Berggren later defended his father, stating that although he was an alcoholic he was not aggressive or abusive in any way as a result, and that both of his parents were well-meaning people. In The Bricklayer, Berggren's stories and anecdotes of his parents are told with love and humor. Eventually, it was his father, and his early life spent among the poor and the working class, that proved to be the greatest influences on his career as an actor.

Career

Stage
After a visit to a local movie theatre at a young age, Berggren fell in love with acting but did not pursue it as a career. During adolescence, he followed his father's tailoring trade and then spent two years at sea. Returning home, he took work in a factory just as his mother had done. However, his desire to act remained with him, and he began to study acting at the Pickwickklubbens theatre school in Gothenburg, which offered lessons to city locals. He made his stage debut at the age of seventeen at the Atelier, a tiny theatre situated directly above a bowling alley. He worked there for two years, until 1956, when he was accepted into Gothenburg City Theatre's drama course. He excelled and became a premier student, completing the course in 1958.

Soon after, he was engaged as a regular player at the Gothenburg City Theatre, where he worked until 1961, when he was granted a position with the Royal Dramatic Theatre in Stockholm. In his first role there he portrayed Nick in Ingmar Bergman's production of Edward Albee's play Who's afraid of Virginia Woolf. In 1993, he made his debut as a director at the Royal Dramatic Theatre with Harold Pinter's The Homecoming. He later directed plays at the Stockholm City Theatre, including August Strindberg's Miss Julie and Samuel Beckett's Waiting for Godot.

Film and television
In 1961, Berggren made his film debut in Pärlemor. In 1962 he met aspiring director Bo Widerberg, who became his good friend and one of his most important collaborators. Like Berggren, Widerberg strongly believed that films needed to focus on human relationships, have a greater political significance, and be socially conscious.

As early as 1960, Berggren declared in an interview that he only wanted to do films that he could truly stand for, to play people who developedan attitude he has maintained through the years. In Widerberg he found a perfect working partner. Their first feature together, Barnvagnen, about a woman who chooses single parenthood instead of marriage, reflected those goals.

The two continued their successful partnership with 1963's Raven's End, a portrait of working class life in 1930's Sweden. Berggren portrayed Anders, a young aspiring writer who finds his hopes and dreams dashed upon the reality of an impoverished existence. In 1966, Berggren was awarded the Guldbagge, the Swedish equivalent of the Oscar, for Widerberg's Heja Roland!, although the film did not receive the same acclaim afforded to its predecessors. But the following year, he and Widerberg embarked on a film that would bring them both international fame, 1967's Elvira Madigan.

The film was based upon the real life romance of Lt. Sixten Sparre and the circus performer Elvira Madigan. In 1889, the pair willfully abandoned their respective lives for each other, but after spending a brief time in Denmark, the couple exhausted their limited finances and the doomed relationship ended in suicide. Widerberg shot the film on a low budget, in natural light and without a script, allowing the actors to improvise freely and to take their time delivering their dialogue. His desire was to make the film appear as if it were a documentary of the couple's romance.

After the success of Elvira Madigan, financially tempting offers began to pour in for Berggren, including the opportunity to sign a lucrative contract with Paramount Pictures in Hollywood. However, he once again defied convention by rejecting those offers because their weak scripts did not measure up to his goals. He openly questioned why so many Swedish actors would dream of making it big in America, and when questioned about his uncompromising nature in 2006, Berggren stated:

I am an artist and I like being one. I belong to a special group of people. I would not compare myself with Van Gogh, Matisse, Munch, Strindberg, or Dostoevsky, but I may be on the same boat, I know. So the talent I have, I have tried to manage. Then you tend to become stubborn and you wish to implement what you believe through your art, otherwise you are not an artist, at least you don't achieve the color and the magic that you would hope for. I see it as a necessary nicety to not have to compromise.

Berggren continued to focus on mainly Swedish productions, including a 1969 television adaptation of August Strindberg's play Miss Julie, about the class struggle between a count's daughter and his man servant, Jean. Berggren portrayed the role of Jean. In 1971, he worked once again with Bo Widerberg in a tribute to labor, Joe Hill, a film based upon the life of the Swedish–American agitator who helped to forward the worker's rights movement in the early 1900s. Passionately proletarian, it elevated the already well known Hill to legendary status with its sympathetic portrayal.

Berggren's career on stage and screen continued to be influenced heavily by the "underdog syndrome", a fact he openly discussed in Jarl's The Bricklayer. His desire to portray outsiders in society remained apparent in his choice of film roles, from 1975's Giliap, in which he portrays a waiter with a longing to escape his life, to 1986's Gosta Berlings Saga where his role was that of an alcoholic clergyman. He also continued to work with Widerberg on several projects, including a 1988 television adaptation of Strindberg's The Father.

In 1999, while preparing for the opening of a play, Berggren suffered a heart ailment in which one of the valves began to malfunction. The illness caused him to drop out of the play and then to retire from the stage. In 2003, he appeared in his last film Kontorstid, about the often empty and meaningless routine of work and daily life. He stated that he felt as if the film and television industry were no longer creating quality work the way that they once did. However, he still dreamed of returning to the stage as an actor, his one true passion. In later years, he devoted himself to periodically directing plays at the Stockholm City Theatre and to his family.

Often considered to be one of Sweden's best and most gifted actors, Bo Widerberg once described the Berggren "magic" as "stage presence", his sorrowful eyes and intensely emotional style effectively portraying societal outsiders like Lt. Sparre and Joe Hill. However, in spite of his reputation, he did not appear to suffer from a feeling of self-importance or artistic snobbery. His most recent project was a collaboration with Stefan Jarl on the screenplay of his 2013 documentary Goodness! The film focuses on the moral decline within economics. Berggren also appeared in the film, both as himself and in character, portraying the role of a greedy miser.

Personal life
Citing the fact that he is "child-like" as one of his best personal traits, Berggren always loved children and desired to have his own. This desire had grown so great over the years that he said he felt as if he were "withering away" from the lack of being a father. In the mid-1990s, his need was finally met with the birth of a son to him and then wife Monika Ahlberg, a chef, cookbook author and restaurant reviewer. A few years later the couple also had twin girls. He and Monika are now divorced, he now lives in Stockholm, Sweden, in Djurgården.

When questioned why he waited to have children, he stated that he "matured late", but that his family had come to mean more to him than he could have ever imagined. He said that he has never put his children to sleep at night without telling them that he loves them.

He also has a great love for art, citing Vincent van Gogh as one of his favorite artists. He stated that he has spent more time in the company of painters than actors.

Political views
My father is my inspiration. He always said, "Thommy make sure that you have something meaningful to do, that you are helping people". I still respect him for that.

Berggren's political views appear to be in keeping with those of his parents, and he has used his career as a mirror to reflect those beliefs, stating that he is like a bricklayer building upon the foundation that has been laid down by his father. His parents were well known both for their socialist leanings and for their desire to help improve the condition of the lives of those around them. They also appear to have leaned toward pacifism, and Berggren has stated that he does not wish to be a part of any film which glorifies violence.

Berggren's father believed that acting and the theatre were "immaterial" and, as such, he encouraged his son to be "a better actor than the rest", if this were to be his career choice. Berggren took this wish a step further, by making his roles a type of "love letter" to his father's fervent commitment, a commitment that they seem to share.

According to the publication Expressen, his motivation can best be summed up in his own words from the aforementioned interview that he gave in 2006. When it was noted that the class struggle had been one of his strongest driving forces in his early work and even today, he responded with the following:

It is with me and it is within Persbrandt and it was in Strindberg. We're working boys.

Awards
Here is a list of selected awards received by Berggren.
1966: Guldbagge Best Actor Heja Roland!
1974: Worker's Festival Prize (Czechoslovakia) Joe Hill (film)
1993: Guldbagge Nominated Best Actor Sunday's Children
1999: Guldbagge Best Supporting Actor The Glass-Blower's Children

Selected filmography

References

External links

1937 births
Living people
Swedish male film actors
Eugene O'Neill Award winners
20th-century Swedish male actors
Best Actor Guldbagge Award winners
Best Supporting Actor Guldbagge Award winners
Swedish male stage actors
People from Mölndal